Saint-Mayeux is a commune in the Côtes-d'Armor department of Brittany in northwestern France.

Demographics

Inhabitants of Saint-Mayeux are known in French as mayochins.

Sights
The church bell, reconstructed in 1730, previously said to have been at the Abbey of Bon Repos.
Saint-Maurice chapel, its altarpiece is listed as historically significant and it has a "miraculous" font.
The Roch ar lien, steeped in history and legend.
The menhirs, Mein al has and Roch ar len
The tomb of the Gauls (a gallery grave, or neolithic tomb)

Personalities
Jules-Charles Le Bozec, sculptor

See also
Communes of the Côtes-d'Armor department

References

External links

Communes of Côtes-d'Armor